Christophe Léon Louis Juchault de Lamoricière (5 September 1806 – 11 September 1865) was a French general.

Early life
Juchault de Lamoricière was born in Nantes. He studied at the École Polytechnique and the École d'Application.

Service 
He was commissioned a sub-lieutenant in the Engineers in 1828.

In Algeria 
He served in the Algerian campaigns from 1830 onwards, being made a captain of Zouaves. By 1840, Juchault de Lamoricière had risen to the grade of maréchal-de-camp (major-general). Three years later he was made a general of division. He was one of the most distinguished and efficient of Bugeaud's generals, rendering special service at Isly (14 August 1844). He acted temporarily as governor-general of Algeria, and finally effected the capture of Abd-el-Kader in 1847.

Juchault de Lamoricière played a part in the political events of 1848, both as a member of the Chamber of Deputies and as a military commander. Under the regime of General Cavaignac he was for a time minister of war (28 June – 20 December 1848).

In the French Second Republic 
From 1848 to 1851 Juchault de Lamoricière was one of the most conspicuous opponents of the policies of Louis Napoleon, and following the coup d'état of 2 December 1851 he was arrested and exiled. Juchault de Lamoricière refused to give his allegiance to the new Emperor Napoleon III.

In service to the Pope 
In 1860 he accepted command of the papal army, which he led in the Italian campaign of 1860. On 18 September that year, he was severely defeated by the Italian army at Castelfidardo.

Retirement 
His last years were spent in complete retirement in France where he had been allowed to return in 1857.

Death and tomb 
He died at Prouzel (Somme) in 1865. His tomb at Nantes Cathedral, designed by Paul Dubois, was completed in 1875.

References

Attribution:

E. Keller, Le General de Lamoricière (Paris, 1873).

 

1806 births
1865 deaths
Politicians from Nantes
Moderate Republicans (France)
French Ministers of War
Members of the 1848 Constituent Assembly
Members of the National Legislative Assembly of the French Second Republic
French generals
Ambassadors of France to the Russian Empire
Governors general of Algeria
Military personnel from Nantes